Kolej Yayasan Saad (KYS), formerly known as the Saad Foundation College, is a private, fully residential school founded by Tan Sri Halim Saad in 1995. It was built in memory of his late father. The school campus is located in Ayer Keroh, Malacca. The school is famous for producing excellent results in the Pentaksiran Tingkatan 3 (PT3) and Sijil Pelajaran Malaysia (SPM) examinations. Additionally, the school is also known for its wide variety of co-curricular activities such as rugby, netball, swimming,triathlon and also orchestra, for example.

Admissions into the school are based on merit. Prospective students apply online and are filtered through a rigorous selection criterion which includes academic performance, leadership potential and co-curricular involvement. From about 5000 applications nationwide, only about 100 spots are offered for the Form 1 batch yearly. Half of these spots are reserved for students from humble socio-economic backgrounds where they are sponsored by local GLCs or organisations such as Axiata Foundation and Yayasan Khazanah. The tuition fee averages at around RM40,000 every year.

Location
Kolej Yayasan Saad is located in Ayer Keroh, a small town in the state of Malacca. Kolej Yayasan Saad lies near the North-South Expressway and accessible through the Ayer Keroh Toll Exit. KYS is 140 km from Malaysia's capital city, Kuala Lumpur, about one and half hour if travelling by car. It is located in a rubber tree plantation.

Extended Curriculum
The curriculum in Kolej Yayasan Saad is include extended curriculum element into the National Curriculum. Students here learn Music Education, Computer Programming, Arts and Design, Guidance Program, English Enrichment and also Mandarin. These classes are only once a week for an hour except for the Music classes which is twice a week.

The Music classes are for the students to develop their music knowledge and help them to appreciate the beauty of music. The school also has three orchestras which is Junior Orchestra, Senior Orchestra and Chamber Orchestra. The school orchestras usually perform in front of honoured guests such as the Sultans and Head of State. The Computer Programming classes teach students how to use HTML programming, C++ and JavaScript and also to create websites. Arts and Design classes teach the students aspects of art and design and how to use it in real life. The subject has a 100% rate in receiving A+ in SPM. The Guidance Program teach the student manners and how to behave professionally and humbly. The SPM results of 2019 once again put KYS at the top with 3 students achieving straight A+, with 58 others obtaining at least straight A's. Almost all the students were awarded scholarships to continue their studies in higher level overseas or domestically.

Curriculum Overview
The school offers the National Curriculum (KBSM) for Form 3 to 5 while (KSSM) for Form 1 and 2. Form 1 to Form 3 students will learn eight subjects as specified in the national curriculum. Form 4 and Form 5 students can choose to be in either the Science or Business stream. They will read twelve down to ten subjects. All students who complete their secondary school education in the school will sit for two public examinations – PT3 and SPM.
The academic time spreads over 56 periods in a week. The school follow closely the one-hour period (optimum teaching and learning duration) in the timetable. The students are not put into fixed rooms according to classes. They move to teaching rooms from one subject to another. There is also no bell in between periods. The school implemented this system to eliminate boredom, improve time management skill and to keep the students active during academic hours. Class sizes are kept small. The teacher to student ratio is 1:10. The academic hours starts at 7.30 a.m. until 2.00 p.m. Lunch and rest periods are from 2.00 p.m. to 3 p.m. Then, the academic hours continue from 3.00 p.m. until 4.30 p.m.

Facilities
The school has six lecture hall-style theatrettes, six laboratories, an amphitheater, a Resource Center, a computer lab, seven specialist rooms, two music studios, an art studio and workshops.

Besides the academic facilities, the school also has dining hall, a cafeteria, dormitories and Surau. These places are for the convenience of the students while staying in this school. Most of the places are air-conditioned, except the science labs and dormitories.

The sports facilities include a gym, a 50-meter and 300-meter swimming pools, a synthetic athletics track, a rugby field, a football field, squash courts, tennis courts, a cross country obstacle course and a multi-purpose hall. The 300-meter swimming pool is also one of the longest swimming pool in South-east Asia.

Student selection criteria
The school conducts a student selection process every year. Any students of any for the next school session are allowed to apply. The first step of the selection process is sending the KYS application form, which is available from the school's website. The school receives about 6,000 applicants per year. In recent years, the number of applicants was risen to more than 6,000 from around the nation. The students that are applying must at least achieve 4A 2B in their UPSR trial result and 5A 1B in their UPSR, good curriculum, good behavior, etc.

From these applicants, 2,000 of those who fulfill the criteria are selected for the written Entrance Examination, taken at 20 venues nationwide. The top only 200 students in this exam proceed to the third and final process, where they go to here for a four-days Residence Based Selection. During the four days process, candidates face testing which includes interviews, IQ tests, a personality test, an aptitude test, a physical test, group presentation, and a stage performance. Candidates are evaluated by facilitators and teachers. From the initial 6,000 or more applicants, only the best 100-140 candidates are admitted into the school in any one academic year (excludes the application from other forms), making the school population of the five batches of approximately close to 600 resident students only.

The school puts in enormous effort and time just to review and analysis every single applicant.

The Houses
The school has three houses, each named after Malaysia's first three Prime Ministers: Tunku Abdul Rahman, Tun Abdul Razak and Tun Hussein Onn. Each house has a Housemaster, Housemistress, Assistant Housemaster in charge, while students form the working committee. All three houses have a colour and mascot.

The Houses in the school are run according to the British-style House system under a Housemaster system consisting of Housemasters, House Tutors and Wardens. Student governance of the Houses are vested in the House committee consisting of the House Captain, Deputy House Captain, Vice 1 and Vice 2. House Captains are coveted posts in the school student governance and all House captains have their names emblazoned on the House board of honour upon leaving the school.

The House system allows the pastoral care of the students to be more effective as each student have access not only to their Housemaster or Housemistress but also to their House Tutors. Each House Tutor has only 8 - 12 students assigned to them which allows for a greater amount of personalised contact and assistance in their academics as well as personal development.

All three houses have their own respective dormitories separately for boys and girls

Events and activities
Every month, a "Union Night" is held by the four societies in the school.
 Bahasa Melayu Society (PERBAYU)
 English Language Society (ELASO)
 Islamic Society (ISSO)
 Science and Mathematics Society (SMATS)

Usually the Union Nights are inter-house competitions, such as the Science and Maths Quiz, Malam Bintang Legenda, English Drama, Choral Speaking, Religious Studies Quiz; there are also Union Nights that are talent shows, talks and speeches.

The school holds annual events such as the Athletics Championship, Swimming Championship, Family Day and Cross-Country Run. There are the KYS annual carnivals: the traditional rugby match with Malay College Kuala Kangsar (MCKK), Victoria Institution and the traditional rugby match with Vajiravudh College, Thailand.

Music programme and orchestra

The School Orchestra was established in 1997 at the behest of the school's founder. Music is one of the compulsory subjects for students in the Lower Secondary School. The programme is performance-based and all students learn to play an instrument or two in the course of their studies here.  The orchestra has about 76 members and about 100 other members in the Junior Development Programme.

The department is headed by the Director of Music (Head of Music Education) and is assisted by two full-time staff as well as part-timers who handle the teaching of percussion, piano, keyboards, brass instruments and guitars. The full-time staff are teaching the strings section which includes classes for violin, cello and double bass.

The orchestra has performed in venues across Peninsular Malaysia which included a 2003 performance in conjunction with the 13th Non-Aligned Movement (NAM) summit in Kuala Lumpur. In the same year, the orchestra performed at the Thailand Cultural Village in Bangkok. Every year, the orchestra goes on tour and performs for dignitaries including the Royal families and Malaysian ministers, parents and students of guest schools.

In 2010, the orchestra performed at the Kuala Lumpur City Hall Auditorium featuring a split programme consisting abridged works from Beethoven to Andrew Lloyd Webber. For 2011, the orchestra featured a serious programme with classical works like 1st Movement of Beethoven's Fifth Symphony, Mozart's Piano Concerto in G, contemporary orchestral works like medleys from the Phantom of the Opera, Pirates of the Caribbean and selections from Andrew Lloyd Webber's works.

Achievements
The school has produced the best results for both the Penilaian Menengah Rendah and the Sijil Pelajaran Malaysia examinations. In the 2006 PMR examinations, a total of 54 out of 56 students obtained straight As or 96.4% in all subjects. This result was the best in the country. In 2007 the school achieved a 100% percent straight-As in the PMR examinations. The same goes for 2008, they also achieved 100% straight-As. And to complete the hat-trick, the PMR candidates of 2009 had managed to get 100% straight-As for the third time. The more recent PT3 examinations also produced similar results as KYS was the number one ranked school in the nation for all five years of its implementation. SPM results are equally as good as KYS becomes a main-stay in the top 10 rankings nationwide from year to year. Just recently, KYS emerged as the top school in Malaysia for SPM 2018 with a GPS of 1.24, beating MRSMs and SBPs nationwide.

In sports, the KYS athletics team have been the Ayer Keroh district champion and Melaka state Champion for many years straight. The school rugby team, also known as the KYS Rammers, is one of the best school rugby teams in Malaysia. The school rugby team has won 2nd cup in KYS Invitational Tournament in 2014 and has won many achievements in Kejohanan Ragbi Malaysia, which is one of the most prestigious tournaments in Malaysia.
The team has played state and national tournaments such as the Sekolah Menengah Sains Selangor 10s (SMSS 10s). The Rammers participate in international rugby tournaments such as the COBRA 10s, Vajiravudh 10s and MCKK Premier 7s. The Under-15 Netball Team also become the champion in the Ayer Keroh zone for many years straight. KYS is also heavily involved with triathlon and swimathon events around the country, often emerging top three in various competitions such as the Port Dickson International Triathlon and the Kapas Marang 6.5 km swimathon.

KYS is also recognized for its English Debate, being a constant force in the arena for years. They have constantly been ranked one of the best teams for various tournaments nationwide, most notably for IIUM IDC and Swinburne Sarawak.

KYS also prides itself with its participation in the National Science Challenge. Constantly emerging as finalists from year to year, the school won the competition twice in the year 2013 and 2017. The winners were then selected to be ambassadors for Malaysia to witness the annual Nobel Prize event in Stockholm, Sweden.

School alumni
The school alumni is KYSER, which is an acronym for Kolej Yayasan Saad Ex- Resident. It was founded in the year 2003. All KYSERs pursue their tertiary studies either locally or abroad many of them on a scholarship.

Notable Kysers
 Iedil Putra - Actor 
 Azeem Abu Bakar - CEO FMT

References

External links 
 
 Aerial View of KYS
 Map of KYS
 

Ayer Keroh
Boarding schools in Malaysia
Private schools in Malaysia
Secondary schools in Malaysia
Colleges in Malaysia
Co-educational boarding schools
Educational institutions established in 1995
1995 establishments in Malaysia